Mohamed Doukouré (born 17 November 1953) is a Guinean judoka. He competed in the men's half-heavyweight event at the 1992 Summer Olympics.

References

1953 births
Living people
Guinean male judoka
Olympic judoka of Guinea
Judoka at the 1992 Summer Olympics
Place of birth missing (living people)